Diodora demartiniorum is a species of sea snail, a marine gastropod mollusk in the family Fissurellidae, the keyhole limpets.

Description
The size of the shell varies between 20 mm and 37 mm.

Distribution
This species was found in the Eastern Mediterranean Sea off Djerba, Tunisia.

References

External links
 

Fissurellidae
Gastropods described in 2004